Que el cielo me explique (English title:A match made in heaven) is a Venezuelan telenovela produced by Radio Caracas Television in 2010 based on a story written by Cristina Policastro.

Marianela González and Carlos Felipe Álvarez starred as the protagonists with Roxana Díaz and Juan Carlos Alarcón as antagonists. The telenovela also marked the return of Caridad Canelón and Rebeca González in an RCTV production.

Plot
Tania is a young urban woman, suspicious and somewhat individualistic, who like most of the inhabitants of violent cities lives with the neurosis and the fear of becoming a victim of the underworld, until she lives an experience that changes her perception Of the world: they assign an important mission of redemption and love to save Santiago.

Santiago, a dedicated and responsible police, lives a tragic fact that separates him violently from his girlfriend Violeta. From being a romantic, kind, joyful and dreamy man, Santiago has a unique and imperative design: revenge. He places his solidarity and ethics on the side of resentment, rather than putting them on the side of law. Now he wants to do away with all those he suspects of his misfortune. It is filled with fury and swears to commit a cold, calculated and overwhelming revenge.

Tania and Santiago, two opposing poles with found realities, will give rise to a struggle that is none other than the reflection of a society lacking in values. He, marked by hatred and revenge. She, after a strong experience, transformed into a woman with a message of peace, will seek at all costs to cleanse the negative and dark feelings present in the life of Santiago.

Cast

Marianela González as Tania Sánchez
Carlos Felipe Álvarez as Santiago Robles
Roxana Díaz as Glenda Núñez
Juan Carlos Alarcón as Carlos Patiño
Estefanía López as Yuni Gómez
Caridad Canelón as Raiza Morales
Aroldo Betancourt as Rubén Llano
Mónica Spear as Violeta Robles
Rebeca González as Rosa Roncayolo
Nany Tovar as Beatriz
Yoletti Cabrera as Marilú Roncayolo
Ricardo Bianchi as Tomás Sanabria "Tomy"
Héctor Peña as Gaetano Morales "El Tano"
Sandra Díaz as Mayte Sanabria
Kimberly Dos Ramos as Karen Montero
Juan Pablo Yépez as Ernesto Valdés
Christian Barbeitos as Gerardo Ruíz
Francisco Medina as Francisco
Eben Renán as Douglas "El Dogo"
José Medina as El Cacri
Alessandra Guilarte as Delvalle Sosa
Andreína Caro as Ana Guanipa
Enrique Izquierdo as Trosky
José Mantilla as Comisario Aguirre
Frank Guzmán as Miky Balboa
Eughlymar Sierra as Adelita
Luis Olavarrieta as El Doctor
Gonzalo Velutini as El Padre de Tania

References

External links

RCTV telenovelas
Venezuelan telenovelas
2011 telenovelas
2011 Venezuelan television series debuts
2011 Venezuelan television series endings
Spanish-language telenovelas
Television shows set in Caracas